Diagoras may refer to:

Diagoras of Melos – an Atheist philosopher and poet (5th century BC)
Diagoras of Rhodes – a boxer (5th century BC)
Diagoras – a Greek physician quoted in Natural History of Pliny 
Diagoras F.C. – football club named after Diagoras of Rhodes
Rhodes International Airport, "Diagoras"
Mr Diagoras, a character from the British science fiction series Doctor Who who became the human part of Dalek Sec, a Dalek-human hybrid
Doctor Diagoras, one of the mad scientists of Stanisław Lem
Diagoras ephialtes - a species of stick insect in the subfamily Platycraninae